The 2015 GSOC Tour Challenge was held from September 8 to 13 at the Paradise Double Ice Complex in Paradise, Newfoundland and Labrador. It was the first Grand Slam event of the 2015–16 curling season for both the men's and women's World Curling Tour.

In the tier 1 events, Kevin Koe defeated Brad Gushue on the men's side, Koe's fourth slam title. On the women's side, Silvana Tirinzoni won her first slam by upsetting Rachel Homan in the final.

the tier 2 winners Jim Cotter and Kerri Einarson both qualified for the 2015 The Masters Grand Slam of Curling.

Men

Tier I

Teams
The teams are listed as follows:

Round-robin standings
Final round-robin standings

Round-robin results
All draw times are listed in Newfoundland Time Zone.

Draw 1
Tuesday, September 8, 7:00 pm

Draw 2
Wednesday, September 9, 9:00 am

Draw 3
Wednesday, September 9, 12:30 pm

Draw 4
Wednesday, September 9, 4:00 pm

Draw 5
Wednesday, September 9, 7:30 pm

Draw 6
Thursday, September 10, 9:00 am

Draw 7
Thursday, September 10, 12:30 pm

Draw 8
Thursday, September 10, 4:00 pm

Draw 9
Thursday, September 10, 7:30 pm

Draw 10
Friday, September 11, 9:00 am

Draw 11
Friday, September 11, 12:30 pm

Draw 12
Friday, September 11, 4:00 pm

Playoffs

Quarterfinals
Saturday, September 12, 11:00 am

Semifinals
Saturday, September 12, 7:00 pm

Final
Sunday, September 13, 6:30 pm

Tier II

Round-robin standings
Final round-robin standings

Tiebreaker
Friday, September 11, 8:30 pm

Playoffs

Quarterfinals
Saturday, September 12, 11:30 am

Semifinals
Saturday, September 12, 7:00 pm

Final
Sunday, September 13, 6:00 pm

Women

Tier I

Teams
The teams are listed as follows:

Round-robin standings
Final round-robin standings

Round-robin results
The draw is listed as follows:

Draw 1
Tuesday, September 8, 7:00 pm

Draw 2
Wednesday, September 9, 9:00 am

Draw 3
Wednesday, September 9, 12:30 pm

Draw 4
Wednesday, September 9, 4:00 pm

Draw 5
Wednesday, September 9, 7:30 pm

Draw 6
Thursday, September 10, 9:00 am

Draw 7
Thursday, September 10, 12:30 pm

Draw 8
Thursday, September 10, 4:00 pm

Draw 9
Thursday, September 10, 7:30 pm

Draw 10
Friday, September 11, 9:00 am

Draw 11
Friday, September 11, 12:30 pm

Draw 12
Friday, September 11, 4:00 pm

Draw 13
Friday, September 11, 7:30 pm

Tiebreakers
Saturday, September 12, 8:00 am

Playoffs

Quarterfinals
Saturday, September 12, 2:30 pm

Semifinals
Saturday, September 12, 5:30 pm

Final
Sunday, September 13, 11:30 am

Tier II

Round-robin standings
Final round-robin standings

Tiebreakers
Saturday, September 12, 8:30 am

Playoffs

Quarterfinals
Saturday, September 12, 3:00 pm

Semifinals
Saturday, September 12, 7:00 pm

Final
Sunday, September 13, 11:30 am

References

External links

2015 in Canadian curling
Curling in Newfoundland and Labrador
Tour Challenge
September 2015 sports events in Canada
2015 in Newfoundland and Labrador